Shivaleeka Oberoi (born 24 July 1995) is an Indian actress who appears in Hindi films. Her early acting work includes Yeh Saali Aashiqui (2019) and Khuda Haafiz (2020).

Early life and education 
Oberoi's mother, Sarina Oberoi, was a teacher. Her grandfather Mahavir Oberoi, who died when her father was very young, had produced a Bollywood film Sheba and Hercules in 1967.

Oberoi was educated at Arya Vidya Mandir School and Jamnabai Narsee School in Mumbai. She graduated from Mumbai University where she studied Majors in English and Psychology. While she was graduating she did a 3-month diploma course from Anupam Kher's Actor Prepares acting institute.

Career 
Soon after graduation, she started working at Nadiadwala Grandson Entertainment and became an Assistant Director on Kick (2014) and Housefull 3 (2016). After that, she started auditioning for films and took up ads and modelling assignments before she got her debut film.

Before venturing into acting, Oberoi worked as an assistant director at the Nadiadwala Grandson Entertainment productions for Kick (2014) and Housefull 3 (2016). She made her acting debut in 2019 with the romantic thriller film Yeh Saali Aashiqui, co-starring Vardhan Puri, grandson of Amrish Puri. The film was directed by Cherag Ruparel and produced by Pen India Limited and Amrish Puri Films. Her second film Khuda Hafiz with Vidyut Jammwal, directed by Faruk Kabir released on 14 August 2020.

Personal life 
It was reported that Oberoi got engaged to her long-term boyfriend actor Karam Rajpal on 15 January 2018. In November 2019, she denied the reports of engagement and called these reports false.

On 24 July 2022, Oberoi got engaged to filmmaker Abhishek Pathak. On February 2023, they married in Goa.

Filmography

Films

Music videos

Awards and nominations

References

External links 

 
 

Living people
1995 births
Indian film actresses
Actresses from Mumbai
Female models from Mumbai
Actresses in Hindi cinema
21st-century Indian actresses